Albert Harrison Hoyt (1826–1915) was an American editor and author, born in Sandwich, New Hampshire. He graduated from Wesleyan University in 1850, studied and practiced law in Portsmouth, New Hampshire, was a paymaster in the army during the Civil War, rising to the rank of lieutenant-colonel. After the peace he was editor of the New England Historical and Genealogical Register (1868–76) and of Memorial Biographies, volume iv (1885).  He was elected a member of the American Antiquarian Society in 1875.

Bibliography
Some of the works authored by Hoyt include:

 Necrology of the New England Colleges (1869–70)  
 Captain Francis Goelet's Visit to Boston, etc., in 1745-50 (1870)  
 Letters of Sir William Pepperell, Bart. (1874)  
 The Name Columbia (1886)

References

External links
 Albert Harrison Hoyt Essays at Dartmouth College Library

American biographers
American male biographers
American print editors
1826 births
1915 deaths
Union Army officers
Wesleyan University alumni
19th-century American historians
19th-century American male writers
United States Army paymasters
People from Sandwich, New Hampshire
Members of the American Antiquarian Society
19th-century male writers
19th-century American lawyers
American male non-fiction writers